Arnold Dean (July 1, 1930 – December 8, 2012) was an American radio sports host notable for live radio broadcasts with Joe DiMaggio and Sammy Davis, Jr.

Dean was born Arnold D'Angelo in Rocky Hill, Connecticut, and was raised by his Italian father in Connecticut. Upon attending Syracuse University, he began his career at WKRT in Cortland, New York, later moving onto WAGE in Syracuse. He then returned to his home state, joining WTIC in 1965. In 1976, Dean launched his own radio show, which would host celebrities and sports celebrities. He was in contact with Geno Auriemma, Artie Shaw, Jackie Robinson, Ted Williams, Stan Kenton, Count Basie, Benny Goodman, Gene Krupa, and Al Terzi throughout his career.

Death 
Dean died of natural causes at his home in Connecticut and is survived by his children Arnold D'Angelo, Jr., Richard D'Angelo, and Mary Rondini-D'Angelo and his grandchildren Samantha, Anthony, Jenna, Nicole, and Nicholas.

References 

1930 births
2012 deaths
Hartford Whalers announcers
People from Rocky Hill, Connecticut
Syracuse University alumni